Genel Energy plc is an oil company with a registered office in Jersey and field office in Turkey. The company is listed at the London Stock Exchange. It has its exploration and production operations in the Kurdistan region of Iraq with plans to expand its activities into other Middle East and North African countries.  The company owns rights in six production sharing contracts, including interests in the Taq Taq, Tawke, and Chia Surkh fields.

Genel Energy was created in 2011 as a result of the reverse acquisition of Turkish Genel Enerji by Tony Hayward-led investment company Vallares.  Vallares was set up by Tony Hayward, financier Nat Rothschild and banker Julian Metherell.  Genel Enerji was controlled by Mehmet Emin Karamehmet through Çukurova Group (56%) and Mehmet Sepil's family (44%).  In 2009, Genel Enerji planned to merge with Heritage Oil; the deal subsequently collapsed.

References

External links

Oil and gas companies of the United Kingdom
Oil and gas companies of Turkey
Economy of Kurdistan Region (Iraq)